Muhammad ibn Ja'far al-Khara'iti (died 327 AH/938 CE) was a Muslim theologian and the author of I'tilal al-qulub (The Malady of Hearts), the earliest book on love in the Islamic world. He was born in Samarra, moved to live in Syria and died in Jaffa or Asqalan.

References

Abbasid literature
10th-century people from the Abbasid Caliphate
10th-century Arabic writers
Love in Arabic literature
10th-century Muslim theologians
People from Samarra
938 deaths